Rhynchosia malacophylla is a species of flowering plant in the genus Rhynchosia, native to Africa (mostly the Horn of Africa and nearby areas), and Yemen. It tends to be a weed in sugarcane plantations.

References

malacophylla
Plants described in 1837